Innico Siscara (died 1619) was a Roman Catholic prelate who served as Bishop of Anglona-Tursi (1616–1619).

Biography
On 19 December 1616, Innico Siscara was appointed during the papacy of Pope Paul V as Bishop of Anglona-Tursi.
On 31 December 1616, he was consecrated bishop by Giovanni Garzia Mellini, Cardinal-Priest of Santi Quattro Coronati with Galeazzo Sanvitale, Archbishop Emeritus of Bari-Canosa, and Alessandro Guidiccioni (iuniore), Bishop of Lucca, serving as co-consecrators. 
He served as Bishop of Anglona-Tursi until his death in 1619.

Episcopal succession
While bishop, he was the principal co-consecrator of.
Giovanni Dominico Giaconi, Bishop of Guardialfiera (1617); 
Nicolò Spínola, Bishop of Ventimiglia (1617); 
Stephanus Penulatius, Bishop of Rethymo (1617); 
Marcello Pignatelli, Bishop of Jesi (1617); and 
Girolamo de Franchis, Bishop of Nardò (1617).

References

External links and additional sources
 (for Chronology of Bishops) 
 (for Chronology of Bishops) 

17th-century Italian Roman Catholic bishops
Bishops appointed by Pope Paul V
1619 deaths